Francesco Pavona  (c. 1695, Udine - c. 1777 Venice) was an Italian painter of the Baroque period. He was peripatetic, and became best known throughout Europe for pastel portraits, similar in style to Rosalba Carriera.

Pavona first studied in Udine with the pastel painter Carneo, then moved to Bologna to work with Giovanni Gioseffo dal Sole, and afterwards studied at Milan, and thence proceeded to Genoa; next Spain, Portugal, and Germany. He married and kept a family at Dresden, where he painted for the court. He returned to Bologna, but left in the course of a few years for Venice, where he was one of the founding professors of the Accademia di Belle Arti of Venice. He died shortly afterwards.

Sources

1695 births
1777 deaths
18th-century Italian painters
Italian male painters
Painters from Venice
Italian portrait painters
Pastel artists
Academic staff of the Accademia di Belle Arti di Venezia
18th-century Italian male artists